The 2013 season for  began in January at the Tour de San Luis.

After the 2012 season, Katusha lost their UCI World Tour license, despite having in their ranks the champion of the 2012 season (Joaquim Rodríguez) and finishing the 2012 UCI World Tour team rankings in second position. The team appealed that decision before the Court of Arbitration for Sport and it was announced on 15 February 2013 that the decision of the UCI was overturned and that Katusha would be part of the 2013 UCI World Tour.

Team roster
As of 2 January 2013.

Riders who joined the team for the 2013 season

Riders who left the team during or after the 2012 season

Season victories

Footnotes

References

2013 road cycling season by team
2013
2013 in Russian sport